Frank Lantz (born December 17, 1963) is the Director of the New York University Game Center. For over 12 years, Lantz taught game design at NYU's Interactive Telecommunications Program. He has also taught at the School of Visual Arts and Parsons School of Design. His writings on games, technology, and culture have appeared in a variety of publications. In 2012, The New York Times referred to Lantz as a "reigning genius of the mysteries of games" following his design of iPhone puzzle game Drop7.

In 2005 he co-founded area/code, a New York-based developer that created cross-media, location-based, and social network games. In 2011 area/code was acquired by Zynga and became Zynga New York. Lantz has worked in the field of game development for the past 20 years. Before starting area/code, he worked on a wide variety of games as the Director of Game Design at Gamelab, Lead Game Designer at Pop & Co, and Creative Director at R/GA Interactive. In 2012, Lantz contributed an interview to the Critical Path Project.

Lantz also had a cameo in the 1987 film Redneck Zombies, as "the crazy hitchhiker".

Credits

Video games
 Gearheads (1996), Phillips Interactive
 Junkbot (2001), Lego Group
 Spybot: The Nightfall Incident (2002), Lego Group
 Diner Dash (2004), PlayFirst
 Drop7 (2009), Zynga
 CSI: Crime City (2010), Ubisoft
 Universal Paperclips (2017)
 Hey Robot (2020), Everybody House Games
 Babble Royale (2021), Everybody House Games

Physical games
 Pac-Manhattan (2004), New York University

Footnotes

External links
 
 
 
 
 

1963 births
Living people
American video game designers
New York University faculty